Beloved is a 1998 American psychological horror drama film directed by Jonathan Demme and starring Oprah Winfrey, Danny Glover, and Thandiwe Newton. Based on Toni Morrison's 1987 novel of the same name, the plot centers on a formerly enslaved person after the American Civil War, her haunting by a poltergeist, and the visitation of her reincarnated daughter. This was the first film produced by Harpo Films.

Despite being a box office bomb, Beloved received an Oscar nomination for Best Costume Design for Colleen Atwood, the film received mostly positive reviews, and both Danny Glover and Kimberly Elise received praise for their performances.

Plot
Sethe is a former slave living on the outskirts of Cincinnati, Ohio shortly after the Civil War. An angry poltergeist residing in the family home terrorizes Sethe and her three children, an act which causes two of them to run away forever.

Eight years later, Sethe lives alone with her daughter, Denver. Paul D., an old friend from Sweet Home, the plantation Sethe had escaped from years earlier, finds Sethe's home, where he drives off the angry spirit that inhabits it. Afterwards, Paul D. proposes that he should stay and Sethe responds favorably. Shortly after Paul D. moves in, a clean young woman who appears to have a cognitive delay named Beloved finds her way into Sethe's yard and is taken in by her.

Denver is initially happy to have Beloved around, but learns that she is Sethe's reincarnated daughter. Nonetheless, she chooses not to divulge Beloved's origins to Sethe. One night, Beloved, aware that Paul D. dislikes her, immobilizes him with a spell and rapes him. Paul D. resolves to tell Sethe what happened, but instead asks her to have a baby with him. When Stamp Paid, a co-worker of Paul D who has known Sethe for many years, learns of Paul D.'s plans for a family with Sethe, he pulls a newspaper clipping featuring Sethe and tells her story to the illiterate Paul D.

Years ago, Sethe was raped by the nephews of Schoolteacher, the owner of Sweet Home. She complained to Mrs. Garner, Schoolteacher's sister-in-law, who confronted him. In retaliation, Schoolteacher and his nephews brutally whipped Sethe, leaving a "tree" of keloid scars on her back. Heavily pregnant with her fourth child, Sethe planned to escape. Her other children were sent off earlier to live with Baby Suggs, Sethe's mother-in-law, but Sethe stayed behind to look for her husband, Halle. Sethe was assaulted while searching for him in the barn. The Schoolteacher's nephews held her down, raped her, and forcibly took her breast milk.

When Halle failed to appear, Sethe ran off alone. She crossed paths with Amy Denver, a white girl who treated Sethe's injuries and delivered Sethe's child, whom Sethe named Denver after Amy. Sethe eventually reached Baby Suggs' home, but her initial happiness was short-lived when Schoolteacher came to claim Sethe and her children. In desperation, Sethe slit her older daughter's throat, and attempted to kill her other children. Stamp Paid managed to stop her and the disgusted Schoolteacher departed. Sethe is detained for an unknown amount of time, and it is later revealed to Denver that she was saved from being hanged by an intervention from the Bodwins, a prominent Cincinnati family who knew Baby Suggs.

Paul D., horrified by the revelation and suddenly understanding the origin of the poltergeist, confronts Sethe. Sethe justifies her decision without apology, claiming that her children would be better off dead than enslaved. Paul D. departs shortly thereafter in protest. After Paul D.'s departure, Sethe realizes that Beloved is the reincarnation of her dead daughter. Feeling elated yet guilty, Sethe spoils Beloved with elaborate gifts while neglecting Denver. Beloved soon throws a destructive tantrum and her malevolent presence causes living conditions in the house to deteriorate. The women live in squalor and Sethe is unable to work, having become physically and mentally drained by Beloved's parasitic nature. Denver becomes depressed yet, being inspired by a memory of her grandmother's confidence in her, she eventually musters the courage to leave the house and seek employment.

After Denver finds employment with the Bodwins, women from the local church visit Sethe's house at the request of her new co-worker to perform an exorcism. Their motive for doing so is partly tempered with guilt; years before, they failed to warn Sethe of Schoolteacher's impending arrival. The women from the church comfort the family, and they are praying and singing loudly when Denver's new employer arrives to pick her up for work. Sethe sees him and, reminded of Schoolteacher's arrival, tries to attack him with an icepick, but is subdued by Denver and the women. During the commotion, Beloved disappears completely and Sethe, freed from Beloved's grip, becomes permanently bedridden.

Some months later, Paul D. encounters Denver at the marketplace. He notices she has transformed into a confident and mature young woman. When Paul D. later arrives at Sethe's house, he finds her suffering from a deep malaise. He assures Sethe that he and Denver will now take care of her. Sethe tells him that she doesn't see the point, as Beloved, her "best thing", is gone. Paul D. disagrees, telling Sethe that she herself is her own best thing.

Cast

Additionally, Jonathan Demme regular Charles Napier has a cameo as an angry carnie.

Production
Prior to Morrison's receipt of the Pulitzer Prize for Beloved, Winfrey purchased the rights to the novel in 1987; the translation to film then occurred a decade later. There was a conflict over screenplay credit with Akosua Busia demanding sole credit and saying Adam Brooks and Richard LaGravenese got too much. WGA gave credit to all three. Busia said they were all little more than script doctors.

Filming locations
Street scenes were filmed in the Old City and Manayunk neighborhoods of Philadelphia. Some other scenes were shot on a soundstage in the city's disused (and later demolished) Civic Center.

Shooting also took place on the north side of the Schuylkill River within Valley Forge National Historical Park in Montgomery County, Pennsylvania, and at the Landis Valley Museum in Lancaster, Pennsylvania.

Shooting was done in a field in Fair Hill Natural Resources Management Area in Cecil County, Maryland, at a spot just east of Big Elk Creek and just south of the border with Chester County, Pennsylvania. The State of Maryland subsequently compiled a location map and photographs of the buildings constructed for the film in Fair Hill NRMA.

Filming locations also included New Castle, Delaware.

Praise for Winfrey
During promotion of the film, Thandiwe Newton said to Vogue magazine, "Here we were working on this project with the heavy underbelly of political and social realism, and she managed to lighten things up ... I've worked with a lot of good actors, and I know Oprah hasn't made many films. I was stunned. She's a very strong technical actress and it's because she's so smart. She's acute. She's got a mind like a razor blade."

Box office 
Beloved was a box office bomb and could not come close to surpassing its $80 million budget. It grossed only $8,165,551 on its opening weekend, ranking #5 and being beat out by the horror movie Bride of Chucky which ranked #2 and grossed approximately $11,830,855 the same weekend. Oprah Winfrey has gone on public record stating that she ate 30 pounds of macaroni and cheese when she was informed the Saturday after the movie opened that "we got beat by something called Chucky." She also claimed that Beloveds failure at the box office was the worst moment in her career and brought her into a major depression. "It was the only time in my life that I was ever depressed, and I recognised that I (was) depressed because I've done enough shows (on the topic). 'Oh, this is what people must feel like who are depressed.'"

Director Jonathan Demme has commented, "Beloved only played in theaters for four weeks. It made $22 million — I think that's a lot of money. And the only reason it left theaters after a month was because the Disney corporation that released the picture wanted all the Beloved theaters—where we were doing very well, in a number of situations — but the Walt Disney company wanted those theaters for Adam Sandler's Waterboy. So, we were told that they were gonna bring us back at the end of the year, and they didn't. But the picture did very respectfully. It was in the top ten its whole life."

The film remained in theaters into the holiday season, and by 27 December 1998 had grossed $22,746,521. The film later returned to theaters for two weeks in March 1999, grossing an additional $110,000. It was also no longer listed in the top 10 on the box office chart by the November 6–8 weekend and had dropped to the rank of 12 on the chart by this point in time.

In 2013, Winfrey reflected on the film, saying: "To this day I ask myself, was it a mistake? Was it a mistake to not try and make [it] a more commercial film? To take some things out and tell the story differently so that it would be more palatable to an audience? Well, if you wanted to make a film that everybody would see, then that would be a mistake. But at the time, I was pleased with the film that we did because it represented to me the essence of the Beloved book."

Critical reception
On review aggregator website Rotten Tomatoes, Beloved is currently assigned a 72% "fresh" rating based on 127 critic reviews, with an average rating of 7.5 out of 10. The site's consensus states, "A powerful, emotional and successful film adaptation of the original novel." It has a weighted average score of 57 out of 100 on Metacritic based on 24 critic reviews, indicating "mixed or average reviews". Audiences polled by CinemaScore gave the film an average grade of "C+" on an A+ to F scale.

Film critic Roger Ebert awarded the film 3½ stars out of 4, praising its cast and emotional weight of the storylines. He wrote that its nonlinear narrative "coils through past and present, through memory and hallucination, giving us shards of events that we are required to piece back together. It is not an easy film to follow. ... The complexity is not simply a stylistic device; it is built out of Sethe's memories, and the ones at the core are so painful that her mind circles them warily, afraid to touch."

Comparing the film and the novel to the Henry James' novella The Turn of the Screw, he noted the use of supernatural elements "to touch on deep feelings" as well as the deliberate lack of a final explanation. He added, "Spirit manifestations come from madness and need not follow logical agendas. It is a remarkable and brave achievement for Demme and his producer and star, Winfrey, to face this difficult material head-on and not try to dumb it down into a more accessible, less evocative form."

He also expressed that some of the audience "will not like it–will find it confusing or too convoluted. And it does not provide the kind of easy lift at the end that they might expect. Sethe's tragic story is the kind where the only happy ending is that it is over."

Accolades
 Academy Awards
 Best Costume Design: Colleen Atwood (Nominated)
 Chicago Film Critics
 Most Promising Actress: Kimberly Elise (Winner) Best Supporting Actress: Kimberly Elise (Nominated)
 Best Cinematography: Tak Fujimoto (Nominated)
 NAACP Image Awards
 Outstanding Actor in a Motion Picture: Danny Glover (Winner)'''
 Outstanding Actress in a Motion Picture: Oprah Winfrey (Nominated)
 Outstanding Supporting Actress in a Motion Picture: Beah Richards (Nominated)
 Outstanding Supporting Actress in a Motion Picture: Kimberly Elise (Nominated)
 Outstanding Supporting Actress in a Motion Picture: Thandie Newton (Nominated)
 Outstanding Motion Picture: (Nominated)

See also
 List of films featuring slavery
 Margaret Garner
 Infanticide

References

 Further reading 
 Tibbetts, John C., and James M. Welsh, eds. The Encyclopedia of Novels Into Film'' (2nd ed. 2005) pp 26–28.

External links
 
 
 
 

1990s English-language films
1990s American films
1998 films
1998 drama films
African-American horror films
African-American drama films
American supernatural films
Films based on American novels
Films directed by Jonathan Demme
Films produced by Gary Goetzman
Films produced by Oprah Winfrey
Films scored by Rachel Portman
Films about race and ethnicity
Films about American slavery
Films about exorcism
Films about reincarnation
Filicide in fiction
Films set in the 1860s
Films set in Ohio
Films shot in Pennsylvania
Films shot in Maryland
Films shot in Delaware
Touchstone Pictures films
Harpo Productions films